Pompiano is a comune in the province of Brescia, Lombardy, northern Italy.

References